Łarpia (German: Larpe) is an eastern branch of Oder in the town of Police, Poland. The name of the river is an origin of the Łarpia Sail Festival.

0Łarpia
Rivers of Poland
Rivers of West Pomeranian Voivodeship